Onarga is a village in Onarga Township, Iroquois County, Illinois, United States. The population was 1,368 at the 2010 census, down from 1,438 at the 2000 census.

Geography
Onarga is located in western Iroquois County at  (40.715432, -88.006928). U.S. Route 45 passes through the center of the village, leading north  to Gilman and south  to Buckley. Interstate 57 runs along the western border of the village, with access from Exit 280. I-57 leads north  to Kankakee and south  to Champaign.

Climate
Onarga has a continental climate, with four distinct seasons. Onarga experiences cold winters, with frequent snowfall and temperatures that sometimes plunge to as low as -10 °F to -20 °F. Average late-December to late-February high temperatures average in the mid to upper 30s. Springs are generally mild, and often rainy, windy, and cloudy with high temperatures averaging in the 50s (late-March) to 80s (early-June). Summers are hot and humid, generally with brief periods of intense thunderstorms and rainfall. Average summer high temperatures are in the mid to upper 80s, with highs in the lower 90s also common. Falls are crisp and drier with first killing frosts generally arriving in mid to late-October. Onarga's typical summer weather is highly conducive to growing corn and soybeans, which dominate the rural landscape. On average, 40.44 inches of precipitation per year fall at Onarga.

History
Onarga was originally laid out in the mid-19th century alongside the development of the railroad from Chicago. Because of its close proximity to Spring Creek, Onarga was one of the first settled areas of Iroquois County. The town grew rapidly, but the population began to level off by the mid-20th century and now maintains fairly minimal population growth. Onarga is often associated with its tree and shrub nurseries that have been in business for over 100 years, earning Onarga the nickname, "The Nursery Capital of the Midwest." Many fields surrounding the town bear rows of trees and bushes rather than corn and soybeans, which are otherwise ubiquitous throughout the region. The prosperous nursery businesses have led to a great amount of ethnic diversity in Onarga, as many Mexican and Mexican-American migrant workers have chosen to maintain roots in the community.

Onarga celebrated its sesquicentennial with a nearly week-long festival in the summer of 2004, which included social events and a strong focus on the history of the community.

Onarga is the final resting place of Civil War spy and Pinkerton detective Timothy Webster. Onarga was also the location of Allan Pinkerton's weekend estate, The Larches.

Business

Onarga has a golf course, several restaurants, and Lake Arrowhead. The only movie theater in Iroquois County is in Onarga.

Demographics

As of the census of 2000, there were 1,438 people, 475 households, and 342 families residing in the village. The racial makeup of the village was 71.21% White, 2.23% African American, 0.35% Native American, 0.21% Asian, 24.41% from other races, and 1.60% from two or more races. Hispanic or Latino of any race were 35.26% of the population.

There were 475 households, out of which 40.2% had children under the age of 18 living with them, 56.2% were married couples living together, 10.7% had a female householder with no husband present, and 27.8% were non-families. 24.8% of all households were made up of individuals, and 15.2% had someone living alone who was 65 years of age or older.  The average household size was 2.87 and the average family size was 3.42.

In the village, the population was spread out, with 33.1% under the age of 18, 10.4% from 18 to 24, 25.9% from 25 to 44, 18.8% from 45 to 64, and 11.8% who were 65 years of age or older.  The median age was 30 years. For every 100 females, there were 109.6 males.  For every 100 females age 18 and over, there were 93.6 males.

The median income for a household in the village was $35,852, and the median income for a family was $46,016. Males had a median income of $31,146 versus $19,732 for females. The per capita income for the village was $13,623.  About 8.0% of families and 10.9% of the population were below the poverty line, including 17.1% of those under age 18 and 5.0% of those age 65 or over.

See also

 List of municipalities in Illinois

References

External links

 

Villages in Iroquois County, Illinois
Villages in Illinois
Populated places established in 1854
1854 establishments in Illinois